DWKP (101.9 FM), broadcasting as 101.9 Zagitsit News FM, is a radio station owned and operated by DCG Radio-TV Network. Its studios are located at Unit 3, Camelo Bldg., Imelda C. Roces Ave., Bgy. Gogon, Legazpi, Albay, and its transmitter is located at Bariw Hill, Brgy. Estanza, Legazpi, Albay.

History
The station was established on October 30, 2015, on Hypersonic Broadcasting Center-owned 100.3 FM as Z100.3 Zagitsit News FM.

On November 8, 2021, as a result of the Cease and Desist Order issued by the National Telecommunications Commission, Zagitsit News FM went off the air due to violation of some policies for provisional authority in broadcasting. However, the management dismissed the claims, stating that political issues are involved in the station's closure. On December 9, 2021, it resurfaced as an online platform under the name Zagitsit News Online.

On August 13, 2022, Zagitsit News FM returned to terrestrial radio via Katigbak Enterprises-owned 101.9 FM.

References

Radio stations in Legazpi, Albay
Radio stations established in 2015